Actinopus caxiuana is a species of mygalomorph spider in the family Actinopodidae. It is endemic to Brazil and is known from the states of Pará and Tocantins, in the North Region of the country. The specific name caxiuana refers to the Caxiuanã National Forest where one paratype was collected.

The holotype, a male, measures  in total length.

References 

caxiuana
Spiders of Brazil
Endemic fauna of Brazil
Spiders described in 2020